The VCU Rams men's college basketball team competes in the National Collegiate Athletic Association's (NCAA) Division I, representing Virginia Commonwealth University in the Atlantic 10 Conference. VCU has played its home games at Stuart C. Siegel Center in Richmond, Virginia since its opening in 1999.

Seasons

References

 
Vcu
VCU Rams basketball seasons